The 1996–97 South Midlands League season was 68th and the last in the history of South Midlands League.

At the end of the season the league was merged with Spartan League to form Spartan South Midlands Football League. For the first season of the new league clubs from the South Midlands League and the Spartan League were separated: all the South Midlands League Premier Division clubs formed Spartan South Midlands League Premier Division North, while clubs from South Midlands League Senior Division formed Spartan South Midlands League Senior Division and clubs from South Midlands League Division One formed Spartan South Midlands League Division One North. Following first season of the new league regional Premier divisions and divisions One were merged.

Premier Division

The Premier Division featured 14 clubs which competed in the division last season, along with one new club, promoted from the Senior Division:
Bedford United

League table

Senior Division

The Senior Division featured 13 clubs which competed in the division last season, along with one new club, promoted from Division One:
Mercedes Benz

Also, ACD changed name to A C D Tridon.

League table

Division One

Division One featured 14 clubs which competed in the division last season, along with four new clubs:
Bedford Eagles
Biggleswade United
Luton Old Boys
Mursley United

League table

References

1996-97
8